Spitamen Bank is a bank operating nationwide in Tajikistan under license from National Bank of Tajikistan.

History
The Spitamen Bank started its Microcredit Deposit Organization in the country as Spitamen Capital in 2008 leading to a banking license from the National Bank of Tajikistan by 2014. The company holds the license for banking operations in both local and foreign currency; reportedly, the company gained this license due to the launch of Spitamen Capital micro financial organization. As of 2014, there are 17 acting banks in Tajikistan.

The company's logo consists of two semicircles combined in one ring to symbolize "endless business process". The up arrow is used to symbolize "growth prospects" and development of the bank and uses gold and silver colors similar to the bank name's color scheme. The bank name has been derived from a Sogdian warlord who was the leader of rebellion in Sogdiana and Bactria against Alexander the Great.

In 2013, at Frankfurt, the Closed Joint Stock Microcredit Deposit Organisation 'Spitamen Capital' received an International Arch of Europe Award, a vanity award.

External links
 Official Website

References

Banks of Tajikistan
Banks established in 2008